The First Cabinet of President Muhammadu Buhari consists of the ministers appointed in the Buhari Administration to take responsibility for each of the government ministries of Nigeria following the 2015 elections. Most ministers were sworn in on 11 November 2015 and the cabinet was dissolved on 28 May 2019, the day before Buhari's second inauguration.

Formation
In an interview published by Vanguard on 19 April 2015, Buhari, whose administration was to begin on 29 May 2015, said he would assemble a small cabinet that might be active before the official ceremony. On 31 May 2015 Buhari was reported to have said he would break with the People's Democratic Party (PDP) tradition where ministers were nominated by governors. He would look for people who were competent, dedicated and experienced. On 1 July 2015 a spokesman for the president said that Buhari would delay selecting a cabinet until September. He wanted to eliminate prior corruption before the new ministers were appointed. Another spokesman said that the delay was "nothing out of the ordinary" compared to the formation of previous cabinets. However, a London-based economist said the delay would not be well received by investors.

On the night of 30 September, TheCable, an online newspaper in Nigeria, reported a list of 21 names submitted to Senate President Bukola Saraki for screening and confirmation. On 11 November, a cabinet of 36 ministers from each of the 36 states of Nigeria was sworn in.

Cabinet of Nigeria

See also
Cabinet of Nigeria
Federal government of Nigeria

Notes

References

Muhammadu Buhari 1
Government of Nigeria
Politics of Nigeria